Quantum theory may refer to:

Science
Quantum mechanics, a major field of physics

Old quantum theory, predating modern quantum mechanics
 Quantum field theory, an area of quantum mechanics that includes:
 Quantum electrodynamics
 Quantum chromodynamics
 Electroweak interaction
 Quantum gravity, a field of theoretical physics
 Quantum optics
 Quantum chemistry
 Quantum information
 Quantum Theory: Concepts and Methods, a 1993 book by Asher Peres

Arts and other media
 Quantum Theory (video game), a 2010 video game
 "Quantum Theory", a song on the Jarvis Cocker album Jarvis